The Battle of Nikopol, or Nicopolis (Turkish: Niğbolu Muharebesi), was one of the early battles of the Russo-Turkish War (1877–1878).  As the Russian army crossed the Danube River, they approached the fortified city of Nikopol (Nicopolis).  The Turkish high command sent Osman Pasha with the troops from Vidin to oppose the Russians' crossing of the Danube.  Osman's intentions were to reinforce and defend Nikopol.  However, the Russian IX Corps under General Nikolai Kridener reached the city and bombarded the garrison into submission before Osman could arrive.  He instead fell back to Plevna.  With the Nikopol garrison eliminated, the Russians were free to march on to Plevna.

See also
 Battles of the Russo-Turkish War (1877–1878)
 Siege of Plevna
 Battle of Nicopolis

References

External links
 
https://web.archive.org/web/20050409083745/http://www.xenophongi.org/rushistory/battles/plevna2.htm
 Compton's Home Library: Battles of the World CD-ROM

Nikopol
Nikopol 1877
1877 in Bulgaria
Nikopol
History of Pleven Province
July 1877 events